Sarah Churchill may refer to:

Sarah Churchill, Duchess of Marlborough (1660–1744), wife of John Churchill, Queen Anne's agent
Sarah Churchill (actress) (1914–1982), British actress